The 1946 Oklahoma City Chiefs football team represented Oklahoma City University as an independent during the 1946 college football season. Led by Bo Rowland in his first as head coach, the team compiled a record of 10–1.

Oklahoma City ranked second nationally among small-college teams with an average of 392.7 yards per game in total offense. It also ranked sixth nationally in total defense, giving up an average of only 121.5 yards per game.

Andy Victor was the nation's second leading scorer during the 1946 season with 124 points scored on 14 touchdowns and 40 extra points.

Schedule

After the season

The 1947 NFL Draft was held on December 16, 1946. The following Chiefs were selected.

References

Oklahoma City
Oklahoma City Chiefs football seasons
Oklahoma City Chiefs football